MIL-STD-1234 (Military-Standard-1234) is a United States Military Standard that describes the general methods of sampling, inspection, and testing pyrotechnics for conformance with the material requirements of various pyrotechnic specifications. 

MIL-STD-1234 was originally approved and published on June 22, 1962 by the Department of Defense.  Later, it was revised in 1965, 1967, and 1973.

External links
DLA ASSIST Quick Search U.S. Defense Logistics Agency Acquisition Streamlining and Standardization Information System
 

Military of the United States standards